Ardclach (Gaelic: Àird Chlach) is a small crofting hamlet, close to Glenferness in the old county of Nairn, Scotland, within the Scottish council area of Highland.

References

Populated places in the County of Nairn
Parishes in the County of Nairn